Zdanow may refer to the following places in Poland:
Zdanów, Świętokrzyskie Voivodeship (south-central Poland)
Zdanów, West Pomeranian Voivodeship (north-west Poland)
Żdanów, Lower Silesian Voivodeship (south-west Poland)
Żdanów, Lublin Voivodeship (east Poland)